Surya vs Surya is a 2015 Indian Telugu-language romantic comedy film written and directed by debutant Karthik Ghattamaneni and produced by Malkapuram Shiva under Suraksh Entertainments. It stars Nikhil Siddharth and Tridha Choudhury in the lead roles, while Madhoo, Sayaji Shinde, Tanikella Bharani, and Rao Ramesh play supporting roles. The music was composed by Satya Mahaveer. The film was released on 5 March 2015.

Plot
The film story revolves around a young man Surya who suffers with a hereditary disorder Porphyria, that prevents him from going outside during the day and enjoying the beauty of life during daytime. He is raised by his mom. Additionally, he falls in love with a TV anchor. Be that as it may he doesn't advise about his medicinal condition to her as he reasons for alarm that she may respond contrarily. She feels sold out when she hears about it from others. The rest of the story is about how Surya picks up certainty and wins the affection back.

Cast

Nikhil Siddharth as Surya
Tridha Choudhury as Sanjana
Madhoo as Surya's mother
Sayaji Shinde as Sanjana's father
Raghavendra Rao as Surya's friend
Tanikella Bharani as Ersam
Rao Ramesh as Doctor 
Thagubothu Ramesh as Kulfi vendor
Viva Harsha as Ice kola vendor
Satya as Aruna Sai
Mast Ali as Zin Zuber
Praveen
Allari Subhashini
Raghuvaran as Surya's deceased father (photo shown)

Soundtrack

Reception
Karthik Keramalu of IBNLive wrote "'Surya vs Surya' is a thoroughly enjoyable fair. It's the season's recommended 'ice gola'" and rated the film 3.5 out of 5. Sangeetha Devi Dundoo of The Hindu opined that the film had a "good premise" and "could have been so much better", she added. Hemant Kumar writing for The Times of India gave the film 2.5/5 and called the film a "wasted opportunity."

References

External links 

2015 films
2010s Telugu-language films
Indian remakes of Japanese films